Three human polls and one formulaic ranking make up the 2005 NCAA Division I-A football rankings, in addition to various publications' preseason polls. Unlike most sports, college football's governing body, the National Collegiate Athletic Association (NCAA), does not bestow a National Championship title for Division I-A football. That title is bestowed by different polling agencies. There are several polls that currently exist. The main weekly polls are the AP Poll and Coaches Poll. About halfway through the season, two additional polls are released; the Harris Interactive Poll and the Bowl Championship Series (BCS) standings.

During the 2005 season, 34 different teams appeared in the rankings by the major polls, but two teams, USC and Texas, held the top two spots throughout the course of the entire season.

Legend

AP Poll
This season was the first season since the inception of the BCS that the AP Poll was not included in the BCS formula. The BCS created the Harris Interactive Poll to serve as its replacement.

Coaches Poll

Harris Interactive Poll
The Harris Poll is the newest poll as it was created in 2005 to replace the AP Poll in the BCS formula. It consists of former players, coaches, administrators, and current and former media who submit votes for the top 25 teams each week. The panel has been designed to be a statistically valid representation of all 11 Division I-A Conferences and independent institutions. The poll operates identically to the other polls, except with 114 members. The poll ends at the conclusion of the regular season, and does not produce another poll after the bowl games or crown a champion.

BCS standings
The Bowl Championship Series (BCS) determined the two teams that competed in the BCS National Championship Game, the 2006 Rose Bowl.

References

Rankings
NCAA Division I FBS football rankings
Bowl Championship Series